Shahrukh Bola "Khoobsurat Hai Tu" is a 2010 Hindi film directed by Makrand Deshpande and produced by Amarjeet Singh Bhasin under the Music Factory banner. It stars Preetika Chawla and Afzaal Khan in the lead roles, with Kay Kay Menon and Nagesh Bhonsle in supporting roles and Shahrukh Khan in a cameo as himself. It was released on 19 November 2010.

Plot
Laali (Preetika Chawla) is one of the biggest fans of Shah Rukh Khan in the city. She believes that one day she will meet him in person and be his heroine, although for now, she sells flowers by the road to make money for her family, brother (Menon), and boyfriend Vicky (Afzaal). One day, while selling flowers, she stops near a car when she hears a voice asking for some flowers. She goes over and finds Khan in the front seat. She nearly faints, but Khan grabs her and says "Khoobsurat Hai Tu" ("You are Beautiful"). Nobody believes her, and her efforts to prove that she met him form the rest of the story.

Cast
 Shah Rukh Khan as Himself (Cameo)
 Preetika Chawla as Laali
 Makrand Deshpande
 Afzaal Khan as Vicky 
 Sanjay Dadhich as John
 Suzanne Bernert as Stefanie Meyer
 Afzaal Khan as Narrator of the movie.

Production
The film was shot in Mumbai, India. It marks the debut of Afzaal Khan and Preetika Chawla.

Reception

Critical response
Anupama Chopra of NDTV gave it 2 out of 5 stars. Nikhat Kazmi of The Times of India rated the film 3/5.

References

External links
 
 

2010 films
2010s Hindi-language films
Films shot in Mumbai